Rudolph A. Winnacker (25 August 1904 – June 1985) was the first chief historian of the Office of the Secretary of Defense, serving from 1949 to 1973.

Winnacker completed a PhD at Harvard University in 1933. He taught for 10 years at the Universities of Nebraska and Michigan, and at the National War College.

During World War II, he carried out research for the Office of Strategic Services at its Research and Analysis Branch in Washington, D.C. and overseas.

In 1953, he worked on the report of the Rockefeller Committee on Department of Defense Organization. This work culminated in the Department of Defense Reorganization Act of 1958. This legislation established the Advanced Research Projects Agency, eventually known as DARPA.

References

Historians of the United States
Cold War historians
1904 births
1985 deaths
University of Wisconsin–Madison alumni
Harvard University alumni
People of the Office of Strategic Services
University of Nebraska faculty
University of Michigan faculty
20th-century American historians
American male non-fiction writers
20th-century American male writers